The Collinder catalogue is a catalogue of 471 open clusters compiled by Swedish astronomer Per Collinder. It was published in 1931 as an appendix to Collinder's paper On structural properties of open galactic clusters and their spatial distribution.

The catalogue contains 452 open clusters, 11 globular clusters, six asterisms, one stellar moving group, and one stellar association. Catalogue objects are denoted by Collinder, e.g. "Collinder 399". Dated prefixes include as Col + catalogue number, or Cr + catalogue number, e.g. "Cr 399".

Collinder objects

Notes

Errors

There are some errors in Collinder's list or references to it. For example:
 Cr 21, 27, 57, 396, 399, and 426 are asterisms.
 Cr 32, 33, and 34 all refer to parts of the much larger IC 1848.
 There is some doubt as to whether or not Cr 84, 182, 221, 254, 265, 269, 283, 294, 336, 387, 404, 425, 456, and 458 are open clusters.
 The positions of Cr 109 and 185 are inaccurate.
 Cr 202 is actually the central condensation of the much larger Cr 199.
 Cr 220 was believed by Collinder to be NGC 3247 when in reality he had discovered a new open cluster.
 Cr 234 was applied to the southern section of the much larger Cr 233.
 Cr 240 is actually the central condensation of the much larger Cr 239.
 Cr 267, 328, 330, 346, 364, 366, 368, 381, 395, 409, and 414 are globular clusters.
 Cr 334 and 335 are duplicate listings of the same object.
 The original alias given for Cr 339 is the galaxy NGC 6393. The correct alias for Cr 339 is the open cluster NGC 6396.
 The original alias given for Cr 371 is of the nebula which surrounds an open cluster he discovered. He apparently did not know he was first to make the distinction.
 Cr 374 is embedded within the much larger Messier 24.
 Collinder erroneously believed that Messier 11 was a globular cluster.
 Collinder’s description of Messier 73 is actually for Messier 72, a globular cluster, and not the object he intended for, Cr. 426.

See also
List of astronomical catalogues
Melotte catalogue - a similar catalogue of star clusters published by Philibert Jacques Melotte in 1915.
Trumpler catalogue - a similar catalogue of open star clusters published by Robert Julius Trumpler in 1930, one year before Per Collinder.

External links

 An annotated version of the Collinder catalogue by Thomas Watson

References

Astronomical catalogues
Open clusters